Susan DeMattei (born October 15, 1962) is an American former professional cross-country mountain bike racer. She became the first American woman to win an Olympic medal in mountain biking when she won the Bronze Medal in the inaugural Olympic Cross-Country Mountain Biking competition at the 1996 Olympic Games in Atlanta, Georgia. DeMattei was inducted into the Mountain Bike Hall of Fame in 1997 and, into the United States Bicycling Hall of Fame in 2012.

Bicycle racing career
Born in Marin County, DeMattei grew up in San Rafael, California. She first became interested in cycling while attending California State University, Chico, where she was pursuing her nursing degree. She began as a recreational road cyclist before taking up mountain bike racing. DeMattei was a talented climber, and almost immediately after taking up cycling she was setting local road hillclimb records with times out of reach of most of the male competitors. She tried her hand at mountain bike racing, to even greater success, and was quickly signed to a professional contract by the Diamondback racing team.

From 1990 through 1996, DeMattei finished in the top three in the NORBA Championship Series every year but one. DeMattei won the silver medal in the cross-country class at the 1994 UCI Mountain Bike World Championships in Vail, Colorado.

Later life
DeMattei married former professional mountain bike racer and teammate, Dave Wiens. She currently resides in Gunnison, Colorado where she works in the surgical unit of a local hospital.

Races and results

References

External links
 Susan DeMattei at the Mountain Bike Hall of Fame
 Susan DeMattei at the United States Bicycling Hall of Fame
 

1962 births
Living people
Sportspeople from San Rafael, California
People from Gunnison, Colorado
American people of Italian descent
American female cyclists
American women nurses
Cyclists at the 1996 Summer Olympics
Olympic bronze medalists for the United States in cycling
Cross-country mountain bikers
Place of birth missing (living people)
California State University, Chico alumni
Medalists at the 1996 Summer Olympics
American mountain bikers
21st-century American women